Ahmed El-Nemr (born 21 November 1978 in Cairo, Egypt) is an Egyptian archer. He competed in the individual event at the London 2012 Summer Olympics and the Rio 2016 Summer Olympics.

References

External links
 

1978 births
Living people
Sportspeople from Cairo
Egyptian male archers
Archers at the 2012 Summer Olympics
Archers at the 2016 Summer Olympics
Olympic archers of Egypt
Mediterranean Games gold medalists for Egypt
Mediterranean Games medalists in archery
Competitors at the 2013 Mediterranean Games
21st-century Egyptian people